Janez Pristov (born 10 January 1907, date of death unknown) was a Slovenian gymnast. He competed in eight events at the 1936 Summer Olympics.

References

1907 births
Year of death missing
Slovenian male artistic gymnasts
Olympic gymnasts of Yugoslavia
Gymnasts at the 1936 Summer Olympics
Sportspeople from Jesenice, Jesenice